Curt Ivan Törnmarck (25 January 1885 – 17 April 1963) was a Swedish sport shooter who competed in the 1912 Summer Olympics. In 1912 he finished fifth in the 30 metre rapid fire pistol competition and eleventh in the 50 metre pistol event.

References

External links
profile

1885 births
1963 deaths
Swedish male sport shooters
ISSF pistol shooters
Olympic shooters of Sweden
Shooters at the 1912 Summer Olympics